Qezel Gechi (also Romanized as Qezel Gechī; also known as Qezelkechī) is a village in Abarghan Rural District, in the Central District of Sarab County, East Azerbaijan Province, Iran. At the 2006 census, its population was 802, in 169 families.

References 

Populated places in Sarab County